Michelle Hess (born 21 September 1984 in Northern Cape Town)  is a South African netball player. Having played with the Queensland Firebirds in the Commonwealth Bank Trophy in Australia, Hess has been confirmed as a member of the Queensland Fusion in the 2008 Australian Netball League. She also represented South Africa at the 2005 World Youth Netball Championships in Florida.

References

1984 births
Living people
South African netball players
Queensland Fusion players
Australian Netball League players
Queensland Firebirds players
Commonwealth Bank Trophy players
South African expatriate netball people in Australia